Organorhenium chemistry describes the compounds with Re−C bonds.  Because rhenium is a rare element, relatively few applications exist, but the area has been a rich source of concepts and a few useful catalysts.

General features
Rhenium exists in ten known oxidation states from −3 to +7 except −2, and all but Re(−3) are represented by organorhenium compounds. Most are prepared from salts of perrhenate and related binary oxides. The halides, e.g., ReCl5 are also useful precursors as are certain oxychlorides.

A noteworthy feature of organorhenium chemistry is the coexistence of oxide and organic ligands in the same coordination sphere.

Carbonyl compounds
Dirhenium decacarbonyl is a common entry point to other rhenium carbonyls. The general patterns are similar to the related manganese carbonyls. It is possible to reduce this dimer with sodium amalgam to Na[Re(CO)5] with rhenium in the formal oxidation state −1. Bromination of dirhenium decacarbonyl gives bromopentacarbonylrhenium(I), then reduced with zinc and acetic acid to pentacarbonylhydridorhenium:

Re2(CO)10 + Br2 → 2 Re(CO)5Br
Re(CO)5Br + Zn + HOAc → Re(CO)5H + ZnBr(OAc)

Bromopentacarbonylrhenium(I) is readily decarbonylated.  In refluxing water, it forms the triaquo cation:
Re(CO)5Br + 3 H2O → [Re(CO)3(H2O)3]Br + 2 CO

With tetraethylammonium bromide Re(CO)5Br reacts to give the anionic tribromide:
Re(CO)5Br + 2 NEt4Br → [NEt4]2[Re(CO)3Br3] + 2 CO

Cyclopentadienyl complexes
One of the first transition metal hydride complexes to be reported was (C5H5)2ReH.  A variety of half-sandwich compounds have been prepared from (C5H5)Re(CO)3 and (C5Me5)Re(CO)3.  Notable derivatives include the electron-precise oxide (C5Me5)ReO3 and (C5H5)2Re2(CO)4.

Re-alkyl and aryl compounds

Rhenium forms a variety of alkyl and aryl derivatives, often with pi-donor coligands such as oxo groups.  Well known is methylrhenium trioxide ("MTO"), CH3ReO3 a volatile, colourless solid, a rare example of a stable high-oxidation state metal alkyl complex.  This compound has been used as a catalyst in some laboratory experiments. It can be prepared by many routes, a typical method is the reaction of Re2O7 and tetramethyltin:
Re2O7 + (CH3)4Sn → CH3ReO3 + (CH3)3SnOReO3

Analogous alkyl and aryl derivatives are known. Although PhReO3 is unstable and decomposes at –30 °C, the corresponding sterically hindered mesityl and 2,6-xylyl derivatives (MesReO3 and 2,6-(CH3)2C6H3ReO3) are stable at room temperature.  The electron poor 4-trifluoromethylphenylrhenium trioxide (4-CF3C6H4ReO3) is likewise relatively stable. MTO and other organylrhenium trioxides catalyze oxidation reactions with hydrogen peroxide as well as olefin metathesis in the presence of a Lewis acid activator.  Terminal alkynes yield the corresponding acid or ester, internal alkynes yield diketones, and alkenes give epoxides. MTO also catalyses the conversion of aldehydes and diazoalkanes into an alkene.

Rhenium is also able to make complexes with fullerene ligands such as Re2(PMe3)4H8(η2:η2C60).

Further reading
 Synthesis of Organometallic Compounds: A Practical Guide Sanshiro Komiya Ed. S. Komiya, M. Hurano 1997.
 Pericles Stavropoulos, Peter G. Edwards, Geoffrey Wilkinson, Majid Motevalli, K. M. Abdul Malik and Michael B. Hursthouse "Oxoalkyls of rhenium-(V) and-(VI). X-Ray crystal structures of (Me4ReO)2Mg(thf)4,[(Me3SiCH2)4ReO]2Mg(thf)2, Re2O3Me6 and Re2O3(CH2SiMe3)6" J. Chem. Soc., Dalton Trans., 1985, pp. 2167-2175.

References

Rhenium compounds
Organometallic compounds